Fedscreek is an unincorporated community and coal town in Pike County, Kentucky, United States.

A post office was established in the community in 1921. Fedscreek was named for nearby Feds Creek, which in turn was named for the obscure figure Fed.

Climate
The climate in this area is characterized by hot, humid summers and generally mild to cool winters.  According to the Köppen Climate Classification system, Fedscreek has a humid subtropical climate, abbreviated "Cfa" on climate maps.

References

Unincorporated communities in Pike County, Kentucky
Unincorporated communities in Kentucky
Coal towns in Kentucky